The German Institute for Literature (German: Deutsches Literaturinstitut Leipzig, DLL) is a part of Leipzig University. It was founded in 1955 under the name Johannes R. Becher-Institut.  Among the noted writers who graduated from the school are Heinz Czechowski, Kurt Drawert, Adolf Endler, Ralph Giordano, Kerstin Hensel, Sarah and Rainer Kirsch, Angela Krauß, Erich Loest, Fred Wander, Clemens Meyer, Juli Zeh, Kristof Magnusson, Anna Kaleri and Volker Altwasser and Werner Bernreuther. Closed in 1990, the institute was refounded in 1995. Currently, Hans-Ulrich Treichel, Josef Haslinger and Michael Lentz are professors.

External links 
  (German)

Leipzig University